Air sports –
 Board games –
 Canoeing –
 Cycling –
 Equestrian  –
 Gymnastics –
 Extreme sport –
 Volleyball

Thailand National Games